Shaw is a suburban village in Berkshire, England. It is located to the north of Newbury, near the village of Donnington. It is in the parish of Shaw-cum-Donnington.

Shaw House
The Elizabethan country house, called Shaw House, is located here. It was one of the Royalist headquarters during the Second Battle of Newbury and, later, the home of the childhood home of the historian, James Pettit Andrews. It is now a conference centre owned by West Berkshire Council.

Transport
From 18 February 2013, Shaw is served by Newbury & District bus services 6 and 6A from Newbury.

References

External links

Villages in Berkshire
West Berkshire District